JS Seiryū (SS-509) is the ninth boat of Sōryū-class submarines. She was commissioned on 12 March 2018.

Construction and career
Seiryū was laid down at Mitsubishi Heavy Industries Kobe Shipyard on October 22, 2013, as the 2013 plan 2900-ton submarine No. 8124 based on the medium-term defense capability development plan. At the launching ceremony, it was named Seiryū and launched on 12 October 2016. She was commissioned on 12 March 2018 and deployed to Yokosuka, which became her homeport.

Gallery

Citations

External links

2016 ships
Sōryū-class submarines
Ships built by Mitsubishi Heavy Industries